Store Urevatn or Urevatn is a lake in the municipality of Bykle in Agder county, Norway.

The northeastern arm of the lake has a dam on it which leads to a canal that brings the out-flowing water to the nearby lake Vatndalsvatnet.

The lake has large populations of brook trout and brown trout, which makes it a popular fishing location.

See also
List of lakes in Aust-Agder
List of lakes in Norway

References

Bykle
Lakes of Agder
Reservoirs in Norway